Nuryanda Datau (born June 7, 1971), better known as Nunu Datau, is an Indonesian actress.

Carrier 
She roles at few of film and soap opera. One of which go back to making up a not appear named after several years is soap opera Intan. In that sopa opera, she roles as Wina, Rado's Mother who is roled by Dude Harlino.

Filmography

Films 
 Sejoli Cinta Bintang Remaja (1980)
 Jangan Ambil Nyawaku (1981)
 Tali Merah Perkawinan (1981)
 Damai Kami Sepanjang Hari (1985)
 Lupus II (1987)
 Rini Tomboy (1991)
 Sisi Dunia

Soap operas 
 Keluarga Pak Is
 Buruan Sayang Gue
 Kau Masih Kekasihku
 Hidayah
 Putri Kembar
 Katakan Kau Mencintaiku
 Arung dan Si Kaya
 Intan
 Legenda
 Kasih
 Sekar
 Nikita
 Kemilau Cinta Kamila
 Kemilau Cinta Kamila 2: Berkah Ramadhan
 Kemilau Cinta Kamila 3: Makin Cinta
 Kemilau Cinta Kamila 4: Cinta Tiada Akhir
 Putri Simelekete
 Putri yang Ditukar
 Anissa dan Anissa
 Badil & Blangkon Ajaib
 Super ABG
 Cinta Yang Sama
 Otomatis Jatuh Cinta
 Kita Nikah Yuk
 Bastian Steel Bukan Cowok Biasa
 Perempuan Di Pinggir Jalan The Series
 Mawar dan Melati

References

External links 
 

Living people
1971 births
People from Jakarta
Indonesian actresses